A constitutional referendum was held in the Democratic Republic of Congo on 18 and 19 December 2005. Voters were asked whether they approved of a  proposed new constitution. It was approved by 84% of voters, with the first elections held under the new constitution in 2006.

Background
The constitution was approved by the Senate and  National Assembly after being agreed by all factions involved in the Second Congo War. It was then required to be put to a referendum. If approved, it would replace a transitional constitution in place since 2002.

Proposed constitution
The new constitution introduced a two-term limit on the presidency and a minimum age of 30 for presidential candidates (reduced from 35), allowing the incumbent President Joseph Kabila to run for office. It also granted citizenship to all ethnic groups present in the country at the time of independence in 1960 and increased the number of provinces from 10 to 26, as well as guaranteeing free primary education.

Conduct
The referendum was originally scheduled to be held on 17 December, but ran into a second day due to issues with heavy rain and incomplete voter rolls. Observers from the European Union said the poll was "largely free and fair" and that the atmosphere at the time of the referendum was peaceful.

Results

References

2005
Constitutional
2005 referendums
Constitutional referendums